The Real News is Pakistan's first English-language comedy show, which airs on Play TV. The show was created by Saad Haroon, who also hosts the show along with co-host Danish Ali. The show makes fun of actual news events using political and social satire.

Current format
The Real News is recorded in front of a live audience in AAJ Studios. The shows starts by parodying current news headlines, after which the scene shifts to a correspondent at a location relevant to current events. The expose section features prerecorded interviews with people about an underlying theme. The show also features live interviews with celebrity guests.
The show is currently hosted by Saad Haroon and Danish Ali.

First season
The first season's 13 episodes aired in 2006 featuring Saad Haroon Mikail Lotia and Danish Ali.

Second season
The second season started airing mid-2007 with host Saad Haroon and Danish Ali.

References

Pakistani television series